Asterodiscides is a genus of starfish. Members of the genus have five short tapering arms and a wide disc. The genus was first described by the British zoologist Ailsa McGown Clark in 1974.

Genera
The following species are listed in the World Register of Marine Species:-

Asterodiscides belli Rowe, 1977
Asterodiscides bicornutus Lane & Rowe, 2009
Asterodiscides cherbonnieri Rowe, 1985
Asterodiscides crosnieri Rowe, 1985
Asterodiscides culcitulus Rowe, 1977
Asterodiscides elegans (Gray, 1847)
Asterodiscides fourmanoiri Rowe, 1985
Asterodiscides grayi Rowe, 1977
Asterodiscides helonotus (Fisher, 1913)
Asterodiscides japonicus Imaoka, Irimura, Okutani, Oguro, Oji & Kanazawa, 1991
Asterodiscides lacrimulus Rowe, 1977
Asterodiscides macroplax Rowe, 1985
Asterodiscides multispinus Rowe, 1985
Asterodiscides pinguiculus Rowe, 1977
Asterodiscides soleae Rowe, 1985
Asterodiscides tessellatus Rowe, 1977
Asterodiscides truncatus (Coleman, 1911)
Asterodiscides tuberculosus (Fisher, 1906)

References

Valvatida
Asteroidea genera